Massimo Dallamano (17 April 1917 – 4 November 1976), sometimes credited as Max Dillman, Max Dillmann or Jack Dalmas, was an Italian director and director of photography.

Life and career
Born in Milan, Dallamano began in the 1940s as cameraman for documentaries and commercials, and after the war he became a cinematographer, specializing in adventure films. Credited as Jack Dalmas he was the cinematographer on  Sergio Leone's A Fistful of Dollars (1964) and For a Few Dollars More (1965).

In 1967 he made his directorial debut with another Spaghetti Western, Bandidos. He went on to direct a dozen more films, including poliziotteschi, giallo films and erotic dramas. His films include Dorian Gray (1970), What Have You Done to Solange? (1972), What Have They Done to Your Daughters? (1974) and The Night Child (1975).

In 1976 Dallamano died at age 59 in a car accident shortly after the end of production on Quelli della Calibro 38 (aka Colt 38 Special Squad).

Select filmography

Sources

Footnotes

References

External links 
 

1917 births
1976 deaths
Italian cinematographers
Italian film directors
20th-century Italian screenwriters
Film people from Milan
Spaghetti Western directors
Poliziotteschi directors
Giallo film directors
Road incident deaths in Italy
Italian male screenwriters
20th-century Italian male writers